The foreign relations of Laos, internationally designated by its official name as the Lao People's Democratic Republic, after the takeover by the Pathet Lao in December 1975, were characterized by a hostile posture toward the West, with the government of the Lao People's Democratic Republic aligning itself with the Soviet bloc, maintaining close ties with the Soviet Union and depending heavily on the Soviets for most of its foreign assistance. Laos also maintained a "special relationship" with Vietnam and formalized a 1977 treaty of friendship and cooperation that created tensions with China.

With the collapse of the Soviet Union and with Vietnam's decreased ability to provide assistance, Laos has sought to improve relations with its regional neighbors and has emerged from international isolation through improved and expanded relations with other nations such as Pakistan, Saudi Arabia, China, Turkey, Australia, France, Japan, and Sweden. Trade relations with the United States were normalized in 2004. Laos was admitted into the Association of Southeast Asian Nations (ASEAN) in July 1997 and applied to join the World Trade Organization in 1998.  In 2005 it attended the inaugural East Asia Summit.

Membership of international bodies 
Laos is a member of the following international organizations: Agency for Cultural and Technical Cooperation (ACCT), ASEAN, ASEAN Free Trade Area (AFTA), ASEAN Regional Forum, Asian Development Bank, Colombo Plan, Economic and Social Commission for Asia and Pacific (ESCAP), Food and Agriculture Organization (FAO), Group of 77, International Bank for Reconstruction and Development (World Bank), International Civil Aviation Organization (ICAO), International Development Association (IDA), International Fund for Agricultural Development (IFAD), International Finance Corporation (IFC), International Federation of Red Cross and Red Crescent Societies, International Labour Organization (ILO), International Monetary Fund (IMF), Intelsat (nonsignatory user), and Interpol.

Laos is also a member of the International Olympic Commission (IOC), International Telecommunication Union (ITU), Mekong Group, Non-Aligned Movement (NAM),  Pacific Alliance (as observer), Permanent Court of Arbitration (PCA), United Nations, United Nations Convention on Trade and Development (UNCTAD), United Nations Educational, Scientific and Cultural Organization (UNESCO), United Nations Industrial Development Organization (UNIDO), Universal Postal Union (UPU), World Federation of Trade Unions, World Health Organization (WHO), World Intellectual Property Organization (WIPO), World Meteorological Organization (WMO), World Tourism Organization, World Trade Organization (observer).

Bilateral relations

Diplomatic relations

See also
List of diplomatic missions in Laos
List of diplomatic missions of Laos

References